Dorsum Termier is a wrinkle ridge at  in Mare Crisium on the Moon. It is 90 km long. It was named after French geologist Pierre-Marie Termier in 1976.

References

Termier